The Love Suicides at Amijima (Shinjū Ten no Amijima or Shinjūten no Amijima 心中天網島) is a domestic play (sewamono) by Japanese playwright Chikamatsu Monzaemon.  Originally written for the bunraku puppet theatre, it was adapted into kabuki shortly after its premiere on 3 January 1721. It is widely regarded as one of his greatest domestic plays and was hailed by Donald Keene as “Chikamatsu’s masterpiece”.

Adaptations
The Japanese new wave filmmaker Masahiro Shinoda directed a stylized adaptation of the story as Double Suicide in 1969.

Milwaukee, WI-based Dale Gutzman (book, lyrics) and Todd Wellman (score) debuted the musical adaption AmijimA in 2007.

The Australian National University's Za Kabuki performed a version of the play in 2005, directed by Mr. Shun Ikeda.

References

 pg  170–208 of Four Major Plays of Chikamatsu
 Chikamatsu Monzaemon, The Love Suicides at Amijima, in Haruo Shirane, ed., Early Modern Japanese Literature: An Anthology, 1600–1900 (Columbia University Press, 2002), pp. 313–47.  .

Further reading
 Major Plays of Chikamatsu, translated and introduced by Donald Keene (NY: Columbia University Press. 1961/1990), pp. 387–425.

External links
The Love Suicide at Amijima: A Study of a Japanese Domestic Tragedy by Chikamatsu Monzaemon
Scan of manuscript at Waseda University Library

Kabuki plays
Bunraku plays
1721 plays
Edo-period works
Japanese plays adapted into films
Buddhist plays